Hypolycaena anara, the savanna fairy hairstreak, is a butterfly in the family Lycaenidae. It is found in Guinea-Bissau, Guinea, southern Burkina Faso, northern Ivory Coast and north-eastern Nigeria. The habitat consists of dense savanna and dry forests in hilly country.

References

Butterflies described in 1986
Hypolycaenini